Accommodations for Marriage is a 1926 German silent comedy film directed by Georg Jacoby and starring Elga Brink, Georg Alexander and Kurt Vespermann.The film was shot at the EFA Studios in Berlin. It was based on a novel by Fedor von Zobeltitz. The film premiered in Berlin on 18 March 1926.

Cast
Elga Brink
Georg Alexander
Kurt Vespermann
Ida Wüst
Mary Kid
Lotte Lorring
Livio Pavanelli
Rosa Valetti
Hugo Werner-Kahle

References

External links

1926 comedy films
Films of the Weimar Republic
German silent feature films
German comedy films
Films directed by Georg Jacoby
Films based on German novels
German black-and-white films
Silent comedy films
Films shot at Halensee Studios
1920s German films